Ménil-sur-Saulx (literally Ménil on Saulx) is a commune in the Meuse department in Grand Est in north-eastern France.

Geography
The river Saulx flows northwestward through the commune and crosses the village.

See also
Communes of the Meuse department

References

Menilsursaulx